Cerobasis pineticola is a species of Psocoptera from the Trogiidae family that is endemic to Canary Islands.

References

Trogiidae
Insects described in 1991
Endemic fauna of the Canary Islands
Insects of the Canary Islands